Schandtauber is a river of Baden-Württemberg and Bavaria, Germany. It flows into the Tauber in Rothenburg ob der Tauber.

See also
List of rivers of Baden-Württemberg
List of rivers of Bavaria

References

Rivers of Baden-Württemberg
Rivers of Bavaria
Rivers of Germany